ENF may refer to:

 East Neuk Festival, an annual music festival
 Eclaireurs Neutres de France, a French Scouting association
 Electrical network frequency analysis
 Elks National Foundation, in the United States
 Enfield Town railway station, in London
 Enontekiö Airport, in Finland
 EuroNanoForum, a nanotechnology conference
 Europe of Nations and Freedom, a former political group in the European Parliament
 European National Front, a coordinating structure of European far-right parties
 Forest Enets language